Lawrence Hargrave Drive, part of the Grand Pacific Drive, is a scenic coastal road and popular tourist drive connecting the northernmost suburbs of Wollongong, New South Wales, Australia, to Wollongong, in the south, and Sydney, in the north. The road was originally constructed in the 1870s as Lower Coast Road, until it was renamed in 1947 after Lawrence Hargrave, an Australian aviation pioneer and explorer who had a house at Stanwell Park and flew his devices from Bald Hill.

Route
The road begins at the Old Princes Highway, Helensburgh (Princes Motorway exit) and passes through Stanwell Tops to descend the steep Illawarra Escarpment at Bald Hill, the site of a spectacular lookout and hang gliding area. The road then passes south through Stanwell Park and Coalcliff to cross the Sea Cliff Bridge and adjoining Lawrence Hargrave Drive Bridge. Together, the Sea Cliff Bridge and Lawrence Hargrave Drive Bridge construction were completed in December 2005, replacing the former cliff-hugging route which was prone to rockfalls and consequent closures. Remnants of the former road can still be seen to this day, including some of the guard rail and most of the road section which is now overgrown with trees and ridden with boulders and rocks that have fallen freely since the roads closure, essentially acting as a ditch.

The road then winds its way through the coastal villages of Clifton, Scarborough, Wombarra, Coledale, Austinmer and finally Thirroul where it meets the Princes Highway at the bottom of Bulli Pass.

History
The passing of the Main Roads Act of 1924 through the Parliament of New South Wales provided for the declaration of Main Roads, roads partially funded by the State government through the Main Roads Board (later the Department of Main Roads, and eventually Transport for NSW). Main Road No. 185 was declared along this road on 8 August 1928, from the intersection with Princes Highway in "The Dummies", via Bald Hill, Stanwell Park, Clifton, Austinmer, and Thirroul to the intersection with Princes Highway at the foot of Bull Pass.

See also

 Bald Hill
 Bulli Pass
 Grand Pacific Drive
 Illawarra escarpment

References

External links
 

Roads in New South Wales
Tourist attractions in Wollongong
Scenic routes in Australia
Sutherland Shire
1870s establishments in Australia